Gabriela Čermanová (born April 25, 1993 in Bratislava, Slovakia) is a Slovak former competitive pair skater. She competes with Martin Hanulák. They teamed up in November 2007. They are the 2009 & 2010 Slovak national champions.

Competitive highlights
(with Hanulák)

External links
 

1993 births
Slovak female pair skaters
Figure skaters from Bratislava
Living people